Ernest Lafayette "Lefty" Jenkins (December 26, 1906 – February 12, 1978) was a minor league baseball pitcher and manager. He managed in the New York Yankees system from 1935 to 1939. He died in California, aged 71.

Career

Baseball player
Jenkins was born in Gastonia, North Carolina. As a pitcher, he spent 10 non-consecutive seasons playing from 1930 to 1946, going 77–51 in that time. In 1935 with the Bassett Furnituremakers, he went 21–9 in 44 appearances. He also managed for the first time that season, leading the Furnituremakers to the playoffs, though they lost the league finals. At the helm again in 1936, he led the Furnituremakers to a league championship - the first year of four in a row in which he led his team to the championship. In 1937 to 1938 it was the Butler Yankees and in 1939 it was the Augusta Tigers.

Baseball manager
He managed the Utica Braves in 1940 and the Tigers again in 1941, getting replaced by Alton Biggs. His last managerial stint was in 1950, being replaced by Lyle Judy.

References

Additional sources
 (Aug 21, 1931.) "Ernie Jenkins Was Hurling Ace For Duke Devils." The Hartford Courant. Accessed October 2011.
 (July 7, 1948.) "Garbark Out as Augusta's Pilot; Jenkins Takes Over." The Sporting News. Accessed October 2011.

1906 births
Minor league baseball players
Baseball players from North Carolina
Minor league baseball managers
1978 deaths